Fuschl am See is an Austrian municipality in the district of Salzburg-Umgebung, in the  state of Salzburg. It is located at the east end of the Fuschlsee, between the city of Salzburg and Bad Ischl. As of 2018, the community has approximately 1,500 inhabitants.

Geography
Fuschl am See covers an area of 21.4 km².  The city lies in the mid-northern part of Austria near the German state of Bavaria.

History 
The Fuschl region is mentioned for the first time in the „Congestum Arnonis“ (as a record of it forming part of the estates belonging to the diocese of Salzburg, from the time of Bishop Arno in 790). From the 8th century the whole area of Thalgau-Fuschl am See-Abersee was owned by the lords of the area i.e. archbishops. For a long time Fuschl am See had no name but in the 12th century the area was known as “Fuschilsee”. (Documented by archbishop Konrad I in the year 1141 chronicling the lake fishermen “ad Fuschilsee” which belongs to the monastery of St. Peters.)

Economy 
Red Bull GmbH has its headquarters in Fuschl.

Transport 
Highway B158 from Bad Ischl to Salzburg passes through Fuschl.

Notable residents 
 Former F1 driver Scott Speed
 Dietrich Mateschitz, Red Bull co-founder

See also

 Salzburg
 Salzburgerland

Notes and references

External links

Official website 

Cities and towns in Salzburg-Umgebung District